The 1987 Junior Pan American Artistic Gymnastics Championships was held in Barquisimeto, Venezuela. The event was originally scheduled to take place in 1986, but was ultimately held from February 20 to 28, 1987.

Medal summary

References

1987 in gymnastics
Pan American Gymnastics Championships
International gymnastics competitions hosted by Venezuela